Tentax penicilla is a moth of the family Erebidae first described by Michael Fibiger in 2011. It is found in southern Thailand and north-eastern Sumatra.

The wingspan is 10–11 mm. The forewings are brownish black throughout, including the fringes. There is a black quadrangular patch at the upper medial area. The costa is basally black, subapically with small black dots. The crosslines are indistinct and blackish brown. The terminal line is only indicated by black interveinal dots. The hindwings are grey with a discal spot. The underside of the forewings is dark brown and the underside of the hindwings is grey with a discal spot.

References

Micronoctuini
Taxa named by Michael Fibiger
Moths described in 2011